The Young Macedonian Literary Association was founded in 1891 in Sofia, Bulgaria together with its magazine Loza. The association was formed as primarily a scholarly and literary organization. 

Although the members of the Young Macedonian Literary Association, called often Lozars (from the title of their magazine) self-identified as Macedonian Bulgarians, contemporary Macedonian historians see in their activity expression of Macedonian ethnic-nationalist sentiments. The Lozars demonstrated both Bulgarian and Macedonian loyalty, and combined their Bulgarian nationalism with Macedonian regional and cultural identity.

Background 
Following the establishment of the Bulgarian Exarchate in 1870, as a result of plebiscites held between 1872 and 1875, the Slavic population  in the bishoprics of Skopje and Ohrid voted overwhelmingly in favor of joining the new national Church (Skopje by 91%, Ohrid by 97%). At that time a long discussion was held in the Bulgarian periodicals about the need for a dialectal group (Eastern Bulgarian, Western Macedonian or compromise) upon which to base the new standard and which dialect that should be. During the 1870s this issue became contentious, and sparked fierce debates.

After a distinct Bulgarian state was established in 1878, Macedonia remained outside its borders. In the 1880s, the Bulgarian codificators rejected the idea of a Macedono-Bulgarian linguistic compromise, and chose eastern Bulgarian dialects as a basis for standard Bulgarian. One purpose of the Young Macedonian Literary Society magazine was to defend the Macedonian dialects, and to have them more represented in the Bulgarian language. Their articles were of a historical, cultural, and ethnographic nature.

Members 
The association's founders included Kosta Shahov, its chairman. In May 1894, after the fall of Stambolov, the Macedonian Youth Society in Sofia revived the Young Macedonian Literary Society. The new group had a newspaper called Glas Makedonski, and opened a Reading Room Club. The group included a number of educators, revolutionaries, and public figures from Macedonia—Evtim Sprostranov, Petar Pop Arsov, Thoma Karayovov, Hristo Popkotsev, Dimitar Mirchev, Andrey Lyapchev, Naum Tyufekchiev, Georgi Balaschev, Georgi Belev, etc.—all known as the Lozars. 

Later, for a short time in the company were involved also Dame Gruev, Gotse Delchev, Luka Dzherov, Ivan Hadzhinikolov and Hristo Matov. These activists went on to various paths. Some members went on to become leaders of  the Internal Macedonian Revolutionary Organization in 1894 and the Supreme Macedonian Committee in 1895. Others later became prominent intellectuals, including Andrey Lyapchev who became the Prime Minister of Bulgaria.

The Greek national activist from Aromanian background Konstantinos Bellios was considered a "Macedonian compatriot" by the Lozars.

Relationship with Bulgarian government 
An article in the official People's Liberal Party newspaper "Svoboda" blamed the organization for lack of loyalty and separatism. The Society rejected these accusations for linguistic and national separatism, and in a response to "Svoboda" claimed that their "society is far from any separatist thoughts, in which we were accused and to say that the ideal of Young Macedonian Literary Society is not separatism, but unity of the entire Bulgarian nation". Despite this, some linguists identify the journal as an early platform of Macedonian linguistic separatism.

Notes

Sources
 Freedom or Death. The Life of Gotsé Delchev, Mercia MacDermott, The Journeyman Press, London & West Nyack, 1978, pp. 84-86; 115.

Modern history of Bulgaria
Macedonia under the Ottoman Empire
1891 establishments in Bulgaria
Arts organizations established in 1891
Defunct organizations based in Bulgaria
Macedonian writers' organizations
Organizations based in Sofia
Macedonian Question